The 1914 University of Utah football team was an American football team that represented the University of Utah as a member of the Rocky Mountain Conference (RMC) during the 1914 college football season. Led by first-year head coach Nelson Norgren, Utah compiled an overall record of 3–3 with a mark of 2–3 in conference play, placing fifth in the RMC.

Schedule

References

University of Utah
Utah Utes football seasons
University of Utah football